You Can't Win, Charlie Brown are a Portuguese rock band from Lisbon, formed in 2009. The band consists of Afonso Cabral (vocals, keyboards), David Santos (keyboards), Pedro Branco (guitar), Salvador Menezes (guitar, bass), João Gil (keyboards, bass) and Tomás Sousa (drums).

Their 2016 album Marrow reached number-one in the Portuguese album charts. The band has played in several major Portuguese music festivals and in international festivals such as South By Southwest and The Great Escape.

Members 

 Afonso Cabral – vocals, keyboards
 David Santos – keyboards
 Pedro Branco – guitar
 Salvador Menezes – guitar, bass
 João Gil – keyboards, bass
 Tomás Sousa – drums

Discography

Studio albums

Extended plays 

 You Can't Win, Charlie Brown (2010)

References 

Portuguese indie rock groups
Musical groups established in 2009
2009 establishments in Portugal